Wayne Douglas Shelton (born June 27, 1945) is a former professional ice hockey player who played five games in the National Hockey League.  He played with the Chicago Black Hawks.

References 

1945 births
Canadian ice hockey left wingers
Chicago Blackhawks players
Living people
People from Woodstock, Ontario